Imperial Wharf is a London Overground and National Rail station located in Sands End in west London on the West London line, and is next to Chelsea Harbour.

The station opened on Sunday 27 September 2009 and is managed by London Overground.

The station is in the sub-district of Sands End where the railway passes over Townmead Road. It takes its name from the adjacent redevelopment of a brownfield former industrial site, which has been developed into a luxury 1,800 apartment river-side complex by property developers St George since 2004. As the Imperial Wharf development continued to grow, so did the business case for the Imperial Wharf station. A further application for 1,500 residential units including a 37-storey tower was submitted to Hammersmith & Fulham Council in early 2009.

The station is also adjacent to Chelsea Harbour, and was known by this name during early stages of development.

History
Calls for a station here were met in 2005 with a fully costed station and signalling at £3 million, of which £1.7 million had already been provided by Berkeley Homes Plc through its St George upmarket London-focused subsidiary, the developer of the Imperial Wharf site, leaving a funding shortfall of £1.3 million.

In October 2007, Hammersmith and Fulham Council announced that St George Homes had agreed to provide another £1.2 million, roughly enough to complete the project. It is also reported that the planning permission for the whole of the Imperial Wharf development was only given on the basis that a station was built.

The station secured full funding on 28 April 2008. The total cost of the station was £7.8 million with the following contributions: £4.8 million from St George, £1 million from Transport for London, £650,000 from the Royal Borough of Kensington and Chelsea and £1.35 million from the London Borough of Hammersmith and Fulham. The first services from the station ran on Sunday 27 September 2009, with a formal opening ceremony by the Mayor of London, Boris Johnson, on 29 September.

Locale

The new station provides an important link for the Sands End area to  station in the south of London and northwards towards  station. This will be particularly important as the area is further developed by both private and public organisations. This investment includes a new residential development called "The Gallery" which has been started on recently cleared land next to the Laura Ashley offices, between Bagleys Lane and Elbe Street.

There are also plans by another developer to redevelop the Lots Road Power Station, into 395 residential units.  The semi-derelict building, on Chelsea Creek close to the River Thames, is a large, disused, coal-fired power station. It was designed in 1902 and completed in 1905 and until 2003 was used to provide power for London Underground. The developers had hoped to complete the redevelopment by 2013.

Services

The typical off-peak services in trains per hour (tph) are:
1tph southbound to East Croydon (Southern)

Some additional Southern services also operate between Shepherd's Bush and Clapham Junction.

Connections
London Bus routes 306, 424 and C3 serve the station.
Chelsea Harbour Pier, which is approximately 250 metres away for river buses services.

Abandoned future proposal
There were proposals, supported by RBK&C, to include a stop at this location, on the proposed Crossrail 2 line (known for a time as the 'Chelsea-Hackney Line'). If these plans were carried forward, then it would provide an interchange between London Overground services and either London Underground or main line commuter rail services, depending on which standards the new line is built to.

However, as of 2014, it is unlikely that Crossrail 2 will route via this location due to the engineering complexities of a kink in the route between the proposed Chelsea station and Clapham Junction. The nearest London Underground stations will remain Fulham Broadway, West Brompton and Sloane Square. Fulham Broadway was also once planned for the Crossrail 2 route but aborted.

References

External links

 
 Imperial Wharf station work begins.
 Imperial Wharf, SubBrit stations project
 London Borough of Hammersmith & Fulham – Chuffed by new train station.
 BBC News Website – A new  station opens in South London.

Railway stations in the London Borough of Hammersmith and Fulham
Railway stations opened by Network Rail
Railway stations in Great Britain opened in 2009
Railway stations served by London Overground
Fulham
Railway stations served by Govia Thameslink Railway